Kan Sorkh (also Romanized as Kān Sorkh, Khūnsorkh, and Khūnsurkh) is a village in Pachehlak-e Sharqi Rural District, in the Central District of Aligudarz County, Lorestan Province, Iran. At the 2006 census, its population was 876, in 157 families, making it the most populous village in the rural district.

References 

Towns and villages in Aligudarz County